George Washington Taylor (January 16, 1849December 21, 1932) was a U.S. Representative from Alabama.

Biography
Born on "Roselawn" plantation near Montgomery, Alabama, Taylor attended private schools. While a schoolboy in Columbia, South Carolina, Taylor enlisted in the Confederate States Army in November 1864, and served until the end of the war. Taylor graduated from the University of South Carolina at Columbia in 1867. He then taught school in Mobile, Alabama, and studied law. Taylor was admitted to the bar in Mobile, Alabama, in November 1871 and commenced practice in Butler, Alabama, in 1872. He was a member of the State house of representatives in 1878 and 1879. Taylor was State solicitor for the first judicial circuit of Alabama from 1880–1892. He declined a third term, and moved to Demopolis, Alabama, in 1883.

Taylor was elected as a Democrat to the Fifty-fifth and to the eight succeeding Congresses (March 4, 1897 – March 3, 1915). He was not a candidate for renomination in 1914, and resumed the practice of law in Demopolis, Alabama. He was chairman of the State Democratic convention which called the constitutional convention in 1901. Taylor was a delegate to the Democratic National Convention in 1920. He died in Rome, Georgia, while on a visit to that city, on December 21, 1932. He was buried in Oakwood Cemetery, Montgomery, Alabama.

Notes

References

External links
Entry at the Political Graveyard
A letter from Booker T. Washington to him
An entry for him in a Who's Who type of book

1849 births
1932 deaths
People from Demopolis, Alabama
Confederate States Army personnel
Democratic Party members of the United States House of Representatives from Alabama
University of South Carolina alumni